The Omni Homestead Resort is a luxury resort in Hot Springs, Virginia, United States, in the middle of the Allegheny Mountains.  The area has the largest hot springs in the commonwealth, and the resort is also known for its championship golf courses, which have hosted several national tournaments.  The resort also includes an alpine ski resort; founded in 1959, it is the oldest in Virginia.  The resort has been designated a National Historic Landmark; it has a history extending more than two and a half centuries. The Omni Homestead Resort is a member of Historic Hotels of America the official program of the National Trust for Historic Preservation.

History

In 1766, Thomas Bullitt built a lodge on the site, which is considered the founding of The Homestead. In 1832, Dr. Thomas Goode purchased the land from the Bullitt family and expanded the medical therapies, establishing a European style of spa treatment and hydrotherapy. It has hosted vacationers ever since, including twenty-three U.S. presidents.

The modern resort dates from 1888–1892, when a group of investors headed by J. P. Morgan bought the business and started rebuilding it from the ground up.  The original hotel buildings burned down in 1901 caused by a fire in the bakery. The main Homestead hotel was constructed afterwards, one wing a year, with the main lobby reconstructed in 1902.

Many American Presidents and influential people were Homestead guests. William Howard Taft spent July and August, 1908 at the Homestead, working and relaxing before the final campaign push, as did outgoing President Theodore Roosevelt, for a short period of time. Other notable guests included cartoonist Carl E. Schultze of Foxy Grandpa fame.

From December 1941 until June 1942, following the United States' entry into World War II, the Homestead served as a high-end internment camp for 785 Japanese diplomats and their families until they could be exchanged through neutral channels for their American counterparts. The diplomats were later transferred to the Greenbrier Hotel in West Virginia.

In 1943, during World War II, The Homestead hosted a very important conference of the United Nations in which was implemented the foundation of Food and Agriculture Organization.

In 1993, The Homestead was purchased by Club Resorts, the same company which owned the Pinehurst Resort in North Carolina.  In 2006, Club Resorts and its parent company ClubCorp, Inc. were acquired by a private-equity group led by KSL Capital Partners  KSL Resorts assumed management of The Homestead at this time. KSL sold the resort to Omni Hotels in 2013 and it was renamed The Omni Homestead Resort.

It was designated a National Historic Landmark in 1991.  Associated with The Homestead are the Homestead Dairy Barns, listed on the National Register of Historic Places in 2007.

Golf

The Homestead features two golf courses.  The club is sometimes referred to as Virginia Hot Springs Golf & Tennis Club. The area produced an 82-time winner on the PGA Tour in the late Sam Snead.

The Old Course started as a six-hole layout in 1892, and the first tee is the oldest in continuous use in the United States.  It was expanded to 18 holes by 1901, and Donald Ross redesigned it in 1913.  The course has been modified at various times since, and the current course has six par 5s and six par 3s.

The Cascades Course is the most famous of the two, and is usually ranked among the top 100 U.S. courses by both Golf Digest and GOLF Magazine.  The Cascades is the course used when hosting national tournaments, including seven United States Golf Association championships.  It was designed by William S. Flynn (who was also a main architect for Shinnecock Hills), and opened in 1923.

There was formerly a third course, the Lower Cascades, which was designed by Robert Trent Jones Sr. in 1963.  It hosted qualifying rounds for the U.S. Amateur tournament.  It was closed following the 2012 season.

Famed PGA Tour champion Sam Snead lived in or near Hot Springs all of his life, and served for decades as the Homestead's golf pro.

Tournaments
 1928 U.S. Women's Amateur, won by Glenna Collett
 1932 National Intercollegiate Championship, won by Yale (team) and Johnny Fischer (individual)
 1966 Curtis Cup, won by the United States over Great Britain & Ireland 13-5
 1967 U.S. Women's Open, won by Catherine Lacoste
 1980 U.S. Senior Amateur, won by William C. Campbell
 1988 U.S. Amateur, won by Eric Meeks
 1994 U.S. Women's Amateur, won by Wendy Ward
 1995 Merrill Lynch Shoot-Out Championship (Senior PGA Tour)
 1996 Merrill Lynch Shoot-Out Championship (Senior PGA Tour)
 2000 U.S. Mid-Amateur, won by Greg Puga
 2004 NCAA Division I Men's Championship, won by California (team) and Ryan Moore (UNLV)(individual)
 2009 USGA Senior Women's Amateur Championship

Recreation 
The resort features a large (60,000 sq. ft.) spa area. There are also a number of formal and informal dining options available on premises.

Ski resort
The ski area at The Homestead was opened in 1959; it is the oldest ski resort in Virginia.

The resort's main and only northwest-facing slope is serviced by three lifts, including a double chairlift which accesses the intermediate and advanced terrain at the top of the hill, and two surface lifts which serve the beginner terrain at the bottom and at the tubing hill. The chairlift has a mid-mountain drop-off station which accesses intermediate terrain.  The resort offers a variety of other winter activities including snow tubing.

Statistics:

Elevation
 Summit Elevation: 
 Base Elevation: 
 Vertical Rise:

Terrain
 Skiable area: 
 Runs: 10 total
 35% beginner
 55% intermediate
 10% advanced
 Longest run: 
 Annual snowfall:

Resort capacity
 Lift system: 3 lifts total
 1 double chairlift
 1 rope tows
 I conveyor
 Uphill lift capacity: 1,143 skiers/hour
 Snowmaking: 100% of trails

Ice skating rink
The resort originally featured an Olympic sized skating rink that closed when the Zamboni became unusable. In 2008, the Homestead built a new 30 X 20 foot ice skating rink in time for the 2008-2009 winter season. In 2013, the ice rink was relocated to Allegheny Springs, adjacent to the outdoor pool.

March 2009 shooting
On March 21, 2009 two resort employees were shot and killed in the hotel kitchen; the community of Hot Springs was briefly locked down under code red procedures as a security precaution.  Authorities identified fellow employee Beacher Ferrel Hackney as a suspect in the killings.  The slayings were the first homicides in Bath County since 1983. On September 2, 2012, Hackney's remains, clothing, some personal possessions, and pistol were found near the Homestead's Lower Cascades golf course.  The cause of death has not been determined.

See also
 List of Historic Hotels of America
List of National Historic Landmarks in Virginia
National Register of Historic Places listings in Bath County, Virginia

References

External links

 Official website
 Detailed look at the Cascades Course
 "Taking the Waters: 19th Century Mineral Springs: Hot Springs." Claude Moore Health Sciences Library, University of Virginia

Hotel buildings on the National Register of Historic Places in Virginia
Golf clubs and courses in Virginia
National Historic Landmarks in Virginia
Golf clubs and courses designed by Donald Ross
Curtis Cup venues
Buildings and structures in Bath County, Virginia
Resorts in Virginia
Houses completed in 1892
Ski areas and resorts in Virginia
Queen Anne architecture in Virginia
Greek Revival architecture in Virginia
Colonial Revival architecture in Virginia
Hotels established in 1892
Tourist attractions in Bath County, Virginia
National Register of Historic Places in Bath County, Virginia
Hot springs of Virginia
1892 establishments in Virginia
Historic Hotels of America